John Lansing Wendell (2 January 1785 – 19 December 1861) was an American judge.

Wendell was born in Albany, New York, on 2 January 1785, and died in Hartford, Connecticut on 19 December 1861, at the age of 76. He was a descendant of one of the Dutch families of New York. He was educated in Albany and Cambridge, New York, his family having' removed to the latter place about 1795. He there entered the law-office of his brother, Gerritt Wendell, became a member of the Albany bar, subsequently judge of Washington county, and was for many years reporter of the supreme court of the state of New York. He published Reports of Cases in the Supreme Court of Judicature of New York, 1828-'41 (26 vols., Albany, 1829-'42), and  Digest of Cases, Supreme Court of New York, 1828-'35 (1836); and edited Starkie's Law of Slander (2 vols., Albany, 1843), and Blackstone's Commentaries (4 vols., New York city, 1847).

New York Supreme Court
19th-century American judges